The International Map Industry Association (IMIA), formerly known as the International Map Trade Association (IMTA), is the foremost worldwide organization of the mapping, geospatial and geographic information industry.  The IMIA has three divisions, the Americas Division covering North, Central, and South America; the Europe/Africa/Middle East division (EAME); and the Asia-Pacific Division.

IMIA is a voice and resource for individuals, companies, firms and institutions who are engaged, directly or indirectly, in the production and sale of maps, globes, travel guides, spatial information and related products and materials.

Each year IMIA, in cooperation with its members, conducts numerous events, conferences and trade shows throughout the world.

Other uses of the IMTA acronym 

 Idaho Music Teachers Association
 Illinois Municipal Treasurers Association
 Indiana Motor Truck Association
 Indiana Music Teachers Association
 Integrative Manual Therapy Association
 Intermediate Message Transfer Agent
 International Maitland Teachers Association
 International Management Teachers Academy
 International Map Traders Association
 International Marine Transit Association
 International Maritime Transport Academy
 International Medical Technology Association
 International Military Testing Association
 International Mobile Telecommunications Association
 International Modeling and Talent Association
 International MultiModal Transport Association
 Internet Message Transport Agent
 Iowa Motor Truck Association
 Iowa Music Teachers Association
 Irish Massage Therapists Association
 Irish Mathematics Teachers Association
 Institute for Medical Technology Assessment

See also 
 International Cartographic Association
 North American Cartographic Information Society
 Algorithmic Traders Association

References 
 International Trade Associations (IMEX)

External links 
 The International Map Industry Association (IMTA)

Cartography organizations
International geographic data and information organizations